Clive Pickerill (birth registered first ¼ 1956) is an English former professional rugby league footballer who played in the 1970s and 1980s.

Background
Clive Pickerill's birth was registered in Wakefield district, West Riding of Yorkshire, England.

Playing career

Challenge Cup Final appearances
Clive Pickerill played  in Hull FC's 5-10 defeat by Hull Kingston Rovers in the 1980 Challenge Cup Final during the 1979–80 season at Wembley Stadium, London on Saturday 3 May 1980, in front of a crowd of 95,000.

County Cup Final appearances
Clive Pickerill played  (replaced by interchange/substitute Gary Stephens) in Castleford's 17-7 victory over Featherstone Rovers in the 1977 Yorkshire County Cup Final during the 1977–78 season at Headingley Rugby Stadium, Leeds on Saturday 15 October 1977.

References

External links
Clive Pickerill Memory Box Search at archive.castigersheritage.com
 (archived by web.archive.org) Stats – Past Players – P
 (archived by web.archive.org) Profile at hullfc.com

1956 births
Living people
Castleford Tigers players
English rugby league players
Hull F.C. players
Rugby league players from Wakefield
Rugby league halfbacks
Wakefield Trinity players